A sailor's valentine is a form of shellcraft, a type of mostly antique souvenir, or sentimental gift made using large numbers of small seashells. These were originally made between 1830 and 1890, and they were designed to be brought home from a sailor's voyage at sea and given to the sailor's loved one or loved ones. Patterns often feature a centerpiece such as a compass rose or a heart design, hence the name, and in some cases the small shells are used to spell out a motto or sentimental message.

Although the name seems to suggest that the sailors themselves made these objects, a large number of them originated on the island of Barbados, which was an important seaport during this period. Historians believe that the women on Barbados made the valentines using local shells, or in some cases, using shells imported from Indonesia, and then the finished products were sold to the sailors.

In his book Sailors' Valentines, John Fondas concludes that the primary source for sailor's valentines was the New Curiosity Shop, located in McGregor Street, Bridgetown, Barbados, a popular shop where sailors would purchase souvenirs. The shop was owned by the English brothers B.H. and George Belgrave. Fondas recounts that while an antique sailor's valentine was being repaired and reconstructed, pieces of a Barbados newspaper were found inside the backing material.

Today, antique sailor's valentines are collectibles, valued for their beauty and unusual qualities. Collector interest has sparked a resurgence in sailor's valentines as an art form, and because of this, shell kits and patterns are now sold at craft shops. Many sailor's valentines, both new and old, can be found on Nantucket, Massachusetts.

See also
Scrimshaw

References

External links
 Sailors Valentine Studio
 New sailors' valentines from Maine

Decorative arts
Seashells in art
Memorabilia
Maritime culture